Trichophysetis whitei is a species of moth in the family Crambidae. It is found on the Canary Islands.

The wingspan is about 12 mm.

References

Moths described in 1906
Cybalomiinae
Moths of Africa